Malvik is a municipality in Trøndelag county, Norway. It is part of the Trondheim Region. The administrative center of the municipality is the village of Hommelvik. Other villages in Malvik include Muruvika, Smiskaret, Sneisen, Vikhammer, and Hundhammeren.

While "Malvik" refers to the municipality as a whole, it also refers to the urban area of Malvik. The villages of Hundhammeren, Vikhammer, Saksvik (all in Malvik), and Væretrøa (in Trondheim) together form an urban area that is also called Malvik. This area is the most populous urban area in the municipality.

The  municipality is the 313th largest by area out of the 356 municipalities in Norway.

General information
The municipality of Malvik was established in 1891 when it was separated from the large municipality of Strinda. On 1 January 1914, a small area of the neighboring municipality of Lånke (population: 38) was transferred to Malvik. On 1 July 1953, a small area of Malvik (population: 37) was transferred to the neighboring municipality of Strinda. On 1 January 2018, the municipality switched from the old Sør-Trøndelag county to the new Trøndelag county.

Name
The municipality (originally the parish) is named after the old Malvik farm since the first Malvik Church was built there. (Mana which means "the mane" is a common name for many mountains in Norway, where the form of the mountain is compared with the mane of a horse.)

Coat of arms
The coat of arms was granted on 23 July 1982. The official blazon is "Or, a grouse close sable". This means the arms have a field (background) that has a tincture of Or which means it is commonly colored yellow, but if it is made out of metal, then gold is used. The charge is a western capercaillie, a local type of grouse and one of the largest of the local forest birds in the area. The design was chosen to symbolize the rich nature in the area. The arms were designed by Stein Davidsen after an idea by Lorentz Svingen.

Churches
The Church of Norway has two parishes within the municipality of Malvik. It is part of the Stjørdal prosti (deanery) in the Diocese of Nidaros.

Geography
Malvik is just to the east of the city of Trondheim, one of Norway's largest cities. Many people in Malvik have their place of employment in Trondheim, though there is some local industry in Malvik itself.

The northern part of Malvik lies along the Trondheimsfjord, and it is along this coastal section that the vast majority of the population lives, and where schools, and places of employment are located. The area has many new housing areas, businesses, and shopping. Collectively, the new area is referred to as the Malvik urban area.

The southern part of the municipality consists mostly of farming and forest areas, with many attractive areas for hiking and cross-country skiing. The Homla river runs north to the Trondheimsfjord. The lake Jonsvatnet lies on the western border of the municipality.

In the southeastern part of Malvik there is the Jøsås exclaves. Three farmsteads, Øvre Jøsås, Store Jøsås, and Lille Jøsås belonging to Malvik municipality are exclaved inside Stjørdal municipality in two different exclaves. Øvre Jøsås and Store Jøsås are located in one exclave (the western one) while Lille Jøsås is making another exclave (the eastern one). The exclaves only have road access to Malvik municipality even though they are inside Stjørdal's borders.

Government
All municipalities in Norway, including Malvik, are responsible for primary education (through 10th grade), outpatient health services, senior citizen services, unemployment and other social services, zoning, economic development, and municipal roads. The municipality is governed by a municipal council of elected representatives, which in turn elect a mayor.  The municipality falls under the Trøndelag District Court and the Frostating Court of Appeal.

Municipal council
The municipal council of Malvik is made up of 31 representatives that are elected to four year terms. The party breakdown of the council is as follows:

Mayors
The mayors of Malvik:

1891-1891: Lauritz Nicolai Jenssen (H)
1891–1895: Christofer Wellén (H)
1896–1897: Jacob de Rytter Kielland (H)
1898–1901: Sivert Kindseth (V)
1902–1904: Ole Brobak (LL)
1905–1910: Sivert Kindseth (Sm)
1911–1913: Haagen Løvaas (Ap)
1914–1916: Peter Haugan (LL)
1917–1919: Sivert Kindseth (LL)
1920–1922: Johan Nygaardsvold (Ap)
1923–1925: Reidar Jenssen (LL)
1926–1931: Olaf Svingen (Ap)
1932–1940: Edvard Muruvik (Ap)
1941–1945: Arnt Løvseth (NS)
1945-1945: Olaf Svingen (Ap)
1946–1955: Knut Kallset (Ap)
1956–1963: Leif Øwre (Ap)
1964–1971: Egil O. Svingen (Ap)
1972–1975: Olaf Bye (Ap)
1976–1979: Kristian Bjerkan (Ap)
1980–1983: Iver Høiby (Ap)
1984–2003: Asbjørn Nøstmo (Ap)
2003–2007: Gudmund Beitland (H)
2007–2015: Terje Granmo (Ap)
2015–2019: Ingrid Aune (Ap)
2019-2019: Bernt-Ole Ravlum (Ap)
2019–present: Trond Hoseth (Ap)

Transportation

To the east of Malvik is the municipality of Stjørdal, which includes Trondheim Airport, Værnes. The airport has frequent connections to many locations in Norway, and a growing range of direct air links abroad (currently including London, Amsterdam, Copenhagen, Stockholm, and Prague). The proximity of this airport means that Malvik, though a small community in a relatively isolated location, has rather good transport connections very close at hand. The European route E6 highway runs through Malvik and it has several tunnels, the longest of which is the Hell Tunnel.

The Nordland Line runs from Trondheim to Bodø (further north in Norway) and the Meråker Line runs east to Sweden. The railroad winds its way along the coast of the Trondheimsfjord in Malvik, and is a very scenic and pleasant journey. Malvik has two railway stations: Vikhammer Station and Hommelvik Station. The Gevingåsen Tunnel is being built to shorten the rail trip from Trondheim to Stjørdal. A side effect of this is that the scenic attractiveness of the trip will be somewhat reduced, as part of the section along the fjord will no longer form part of the trip. The railway junction where the line splits for Bodø or Sweden is just to the east of Malvik, at a small settlement called Hell. The station is well known to railway enthusiasts from its odd name (for English language speakers). It is indeed possible, in Malvik, to purchase "a single ticket to Hell" or a return "to Hell and back".

Notable residents

 Werner Hosewinckel Christie (1877 in Hommelvik – 1927) Norwegian agricultural researcher
 Johan Nygaardsvold (1879 in Hommelvik – 1952) Prime Minister of Norway 1935 to 1945
 Rut Tellefsen (born 1930 in Malvik) a Norwegian actress 
 Torgeir Moan (born 1944 in Malvik) a Norwegian engineer and professor of marine technology
 Mads Eriksen (born 1977 in Malvik) a Norwegian cartoonist

Sport 
 Thomas Byberg (1916 in Hommelvik – 1998) a speed skater, silver medallist at the 1948 Winter Olympics 
 Arne Herjuaune (1945 in Malvik – 2017) a speed skater, competed at the 1968 Winter Olympics
 Kristine Nøstmo (born 1993 in Malvik) a football goalkeeper, 165 caps with Rosenborg BK Kvinner

References

External links

Municipal Homepage 
Municipal fact sheet from Statistics Norway 

 
Municipalities of Trøndelag
1891 establishments in Norway